Jean-Marie Cuoq (born 21 September 1967) is a French rally driver. He finished seventh on the 2008 Monte Carlo Rally in a privately entered Peugeot 307 WRC, scoring two World Rally Championship points.

Career
Cuoq won the French Gravel Rally Championship in 2005, 2006, 2007 and 2010. In 2007 he also won the French asphalt title, but in February 2008 he was stripped of this title for having a notebook from the previous year during the reconnaissance for the Rallye du Var. He and co-driver David Marty also had their licenses suspended for 24 months, with 12 months suspended.

In January 2007 Cuoq made his World Rally Championship debut on Monte Carlo Rally where he finished ninth. One year later he scored his first WRC points by finishing seventh.

After his suspension he returned to the WRC for the 2010 Rally de Portugal, but retired from the rally.

References

External links

Official website 
Profile at eWRC-results.com
Profile at RallyBase

1967 births
Living people
World Rally Championship drivers
French rally drivers
Place of birth missing (living people)